The 2008 Summer Olympics torch relay route involved 21 countries where the Olympic torch was carried between its lighting in Greece in March 2008 and the Olympic opening ceremony in China's host city of Beijing in August 2008. The relay took place in four separate legs: in Greece, an international leg, in the Special Administrative Region of China (Hong Kong and Macau), and in mainland China.

The planned route originally included a stop in Taipei between Ho Chi Minh City and Hong Kong, but there was disagreement in Beijing and Taipei over language used to describe whether it was an international or a domestic part of the route. While the Olympic committees of China and Chinese Taipei reached initial consensus on the approach, the government of the Republic of China in Taiwan intervened, stating that this placement could be interpreted as placing Taiwan on the same level as Hong Kong and Macau, an implication it objected to. The Beijing Organizing Committee attempted to continue negotiation, but further disputes arose over the flag or the anthem of the Republic of China along the 24 km torch route in Taiwan. By the midnight deadline for concluding the negotiation on September 21, 2007, Taiwan authorities and Mainland China were unable to come to terms with the issue of the Torch Relay. In the end, both sides of the Taiwan Strait decided to eliminate the Taipei leg.

Route in Greece

International and HK&Macau route

The opening relay route ceremony was held at the Hong Kong Cultural Centre. The song "We are ready" was performed by Eason Chan, Hotcha, EO2 accompanied by Hong Kong Chinese Orchestra, Hong Kong Dance company, Gauido international golden eagle gymnastics team, and senior mixed choir of the Diocesan Girls' School and the Diocesan Boys' School.

Hong Kong and Macau gallery

Route in Mainland China

The total torchbearer counts for each city are available at the official website of the torch relay.
The relay was suspended from May 19 – 21 to honor victims of the 2008 Sichuan earthquake.

See also 
 2008 Summer Olympics torch relay

References 

Torch relay
Olympic torch relays